The Shadow Ministry of Michael O'Brien is the Coalition opposition since December 2018, opposing the Andrews government in the Parliament of Victoria. It is led by Michael O'Brien following his election as leader of the party and Victorian Leader of the Opposition on 6 December 2018. The shadow cabinet is made up of the caucuses from the Liberal Party and Nationals. O'Brien's shadow ministry has seen one major reshuffle in March 2021 after a failed leadership spill by Brad Battin.

Shadow Cabinet

Former Members of the Shadow Cabinet

See also
 Second Andrews Ministry
 Opposition (Victoria)
 2018 Victorian state election

References

External links
 List of Current Shadow Ministers (Parliament of Victoria)

Victoria shadow ministries
Politics of Victoria (Australia)
2018 establishments in Australia
2021 disestablishments in Australia